Acrobasis consociella is a moth of the family Pyralidae. It is found in Europe.

The wingspan is 19–22 mm. The moth flies in one generation from the end of May to August.
The larva feeds on oak.

References

External links

 Microlepidoptera.nl 
 waarneming.nl .
 Lepidoptera of Belgium
Acrobasis consociella on UKmoths

Moths described in 1813
Acrobasis
Moths of Europe